Sreeja Chandran is an Indian television actress who predominantly works in Malayalam and Tamil soap operas.  She played the lead in STAR Vijay's serial Saravannan Meenatchi as Meenatchi.

Personal life 

She acted in Saravanan Meenatchi with RJ Senthil Kumar and married him on 2 July 2014.

Television

Filmography

References

Living people
Year of birth missing (living people)
21st-century Indian actresses
Actresses from Kerala
Actresses in Malayalam cinema
Actresses in Malayalam television
Actresses in Tamil cinema
Actresses in Tamil television
Indian film actresses
Indian television actresses
People from Thiruvalla